Stroheim is a municipality in the district of Eferding in the Austrian state of Upper Austria.

Geography
Stroheim lies in the Hausruckviertel on a ridge overlooking the Eferding Basin. About 29 percent of the municipality is forest and 63 percent farmland.

References

Cities and towns in Eferding District